Margot Peters (born May 13, 1933, died June 18, 2022) was an American novelist and biographer, including of Charlotte Brontë, George Bernard Shaw, Mrs. Patrick Campbell, the Drews and Barrymores, May Sarton, Alfred Lunt and Lynn Fontanne. She was a recipient of the Ambassador Book Award.

Early life and education 
Peters was born in Wausau, Wisconsin, and earned undergraduate and graduate degrees from the University of Wisconsin at Madison.

Career 
Peters taught at Northland College in Ashland, Wisconsin and held the Kathe Tappe Vemon Chair in Biography at Dartmouth College. In 1963 she became a faculty member in English literature at the University of Wisconsin, Whitewater, where she rose to full professor. She also taught women's studies, and since retiring in 1991 is now professor emerita.

Her first book, Charlotte Bronte: Style in the Novel, was based on her PhD dissertation.

Awards 
She won the Friends of American Writers award for best work of prose in 1975 for Unquiet Soul: A Biography of Charlotte Bronte and Banta Awards in 1981 and 1985, for Bernard Shaw and the Actresses and for Mrs. Pat: The Life of Mrs. Patrick Campbell, respectively.

Selected works

Biographies
 Charlotte Brontë: Style in the Novel. Madison: University of Wisconsin Press, 1973.
 Unquiet Soul: A Biography of Charlotte Brontë New York: Doubleday, 1975. (London: Hodder and Stoughton, 1975. Paris: Editions Stock, 1979. Reprint New York & London, 1986, 1987.)
 Bernard Shaw and the Actresses. New York: Doubleday, 1980.
 Mrs. Pat: The Biography of Mrs. Patrick Campbell. New York: Alfred A. Knopf, 1984; London: The Bodley Head, 1984; Hamish Hamilton, 1985.
 The House of Barrymore.  New York: Alfred A. Knopf, 1990.
 May Sarton: A Biography.  New York: Alfred A. Knopf, 1997; Ballentine, 1998.
 Design for Living: Alfred Lunt and Lynn Fontanne. New York: Knopf, 2003.
 Lorine Niedecker: A Poet's Life. Madison: University of Wisconsin Press, 2011.

Other Works
 Wild Justice.  New York: St. Martin's Press, 1995. Published in paperback as Most Wanted, 1996.
 Summers: A True Love Story. Xlibris, 2011.

References

External links
 Works by Margot Peters at WorldCat
 Official blog

1933 births
Living people
People from Wausau, Wisconsin
Novelists from Wisconsin
American biographers
American women novelists
American women biographers
21st-century American women